This page is a list of current and former vibraphone manufacturers. There are multiple design approaches along with varying features, including timbral differences, that each of these manufacturers lay claim to.

Current manufacturers
 Adams Musical Instruments
Majestic Percussion
Musser Mallet Company
Premier Percussion
Yamaha Percussion

Defunct companies
 J.C. Deagan, Inc.
 Leedy Manufacturing Company

References

.Vibraphone
Vibraphone